The 1955 Nippon Professional Baseball season was the sixth season of operation of Nippon Professional Baseball (NPB). This season featured the worst statistical season by winning percentage in NPB history, a .231 winning percentage set by the Taiyo Whales. This season also saw the most wins in a single season by a single team in NPB history, with the Nankai Hawks winning a record 99 games.

The Yomiuri Giants defeated the Nankai Hawks in the Japan Series, 4 games to 3, marking the Giants' 4th NPB championship, all of which to this point had come against the Hawks.

Regular season

Standings

Postseason

Japan Series

League leaders

Central League

Pacific League

Awards
Most Valuable Player
Tetsuharu Kawakami, Yomiuri Giants (CL)
Tokuji Iida, Nankai Hawks (PL)
Rookie of the Year
Kazunori Nishimura, Osaka Tigers (CL)
Kihachi Enomoto, Mainichi Orions (PL)
Eiji Sawamura Award
Takehiko Bessho, Yomiuri Giants (CL)

See also
1955 Major League Baseball season

References